Moses & Søn G. Melchior was a trading house based in Copenhagen, Denmark. It traded on the Danish West Indies with its own ships from circa 1820 and was also involved in passenger transport.

History
 
The company was founded by Moses Marcus Melchior (1736-1817) in 1760. The company  was originally based at  Amagertorv 11. The company initially specialized in import of tobacco from the Netherlands but began to trade on the Danish West Indies from circa 1790.

Melchior's son Gerson Melchior (1771-1845) continued the company together with his two eldest sons  after his father's death in 1817. The company acquired its first ships in circa 1820. They sailed on the Danish West Indies, both with freight and passengers.

A third brother, Moritz Melchior (1816-1884). joined the company in 1840. One of his elder brothers had died in 1834 and the other one died in 1843; he therefore continued the company alone when his father died in 1845 but his younger brothers Moses Melchior (1825-1912) and Israel Melchior (1827-1893) joined the company in 1848 and 1853. An elder brother, Sally Melchior (1814-1865), established a company in Hamburg in a partnership with his later brother-in-law Bernhard Dehn (1808-1863)

Moses & Søn G. Melchior relocated to Højbro Plads 21 in 1855. In 1865, it was a co-founder of the company Det Danske Fiskeriselskab. The company owned the whaler Thomas Roys.

Moses Melchior and Moritz Melchior's son  Carl Henriques Melchior (born 1855) headed the company after Moritz Melchior's death in 1884. It sold its last ship, Clara, a brig, in 1905.

In 1912, the company relocated to Strandgade 34 in Christianshavn.

Fleet
 1803 - Birgitte (ID=13637).
 1814 - Mathilde (ID=9414).
 1816 - Alexander Magnus (ID=12207).
 1817 - Emilie
 1825 - Prins Frederæ IK Carl Christian af Danmark (ID=9302).
 1827 - Anna (ID=14262).
 1834 - Hiram (ID=13645).
 1837 - Christian (ID=8484).
 1837 - Niord (ID=13528).
 1839 - Ytiyon (ID=9416).
 1844 - Christian (ID=12019).
 1848 - Malvina (ID=3479).
 1851 - Gerson (ID=9415).
 1854 - Eurika (ID=13635).
 1854 - Birgitte Melchior (I) (ID=6962).
 1855 - Galilei (ID=3386).
 1855 - Carl(ID=11040).
 1856 - Birgitte Melchior (II) (ID=13633).
 1858 - Helge (ID=13638).
 1859 - Hroar (ID=13640).
 1859 - Marecahl PELISSIER (ID=13641).
 1859 - Skalagrimur (ID=13642).
 1861 - Dorothea Melchior (ID=13527).
 1863 - Johanne Marie (ID=12107).
 1866 - Thomas Roys (ID=3121).
 1866 - Gardar (ID=13646).
 1868 - Else, kutter, b. i Danzig, 51,68 BRT, 444,48 NRT ex STEINBUTT, indfl. 1871-11-22 until kaptajn L.W. Roed m.fl. og næ. until ELSE, hjs. Nykk.F. 
Solgt 1871-12-20 until Melchior. Borteblevet siden det 1873-01-29 forlod København på rejse until Island.
 1872 - Birgitte Melchior (III) (ID=13644).
 1875 - Clara (ID=9417).
 1875 - Henriette Melchior (ID=10585).
 1877 - Thea (ID=9358).
 1878 - Freya (ID=13634).

References

Further reading
 Martin-Meyer,Povl : Moses & Søn G. Melchior

External links

 Moses & Søn G. Melchior 
 Ventegodt, Gerson Melchior's country house on Nørrebrogade

Defunct companies of Denmark
Danish companies established in 1760